Georgios Lyras (born 23 June 1994) is a Greek professional footballer who last played as a left winger for German club Türkspor Augsburg.

Career 
He began his career from the youth teams of Olympiacos, under coach Bernd Storck. In 2013, he was given on loan to Vataniakos and then in January 2014 to Fostiras, in which he had a full season helping his team to reach the promotion Play-offs to the Super League. On 13 January 2015 he signed a 1.5-year contract with AE Larissa, making 4 league appearances.  On 31 July 2015, the young player who had a contract for another year with the "crimsons", was told that is not calculated for the new season by his manager Ratko Dostanić and was asked to search for a new team to continue his career.

References

External links
larissa sport news
Crimson Scorer
My Player Profile

1994 births
Living people
Greek footballers
Athlitiki Enosi Larissa F.C. players
Olympiacos F.C. players
Fostiras F.C. players
GAS Ialysos 1948 F.C. players
AO Chania F.C. players
Acharnaikos F.C. players
SV Eintracht Trier 05 players
Makedonikos F.C. players
PAEEK players
Aittitos Spata F.C. players
Expatriate footballers in Cyprus
Greek expatriate footballers
Greek expatriate sportspeople in Cyprus
Expatriate footballers in Germany
Greek expatriate sportspeople in Germany
Football League (Greece) players
Cypriot Second Division players
Association football midfielders
People from Pieria (regional unit)
Footballers from Central Macedonia